Yumu may refer to:
 Yumu people, an ethnic group of Australia
 Yumu language (Australia)
 Yumu language (Nigeria)
 Yumu Kudo, Japanese footballer

Language and nationality disambiguation pages